Incarcha is a genus of snout moths. It was described by Harrison Gray Dyar Jr. in 1910 and contains species found in South America.

There are two species recognised in the genus Incarcha:
 Incarcha aporalis Dyar, 1910
 Incarcha argentilinea Druce, 1910

References

Epipaschiinae
Moths of South America
Pyralidae genera
Taxa named by Harrison Gray Dyar Jr.